Bab Sharqi ("The Eastern Gate"), also known as the Gate of the Sun, is one of the seven ancient city gates of Damascus, Syria. Its modern name comes from its location in the eastern side of the city. The gate also gives its name to the Christian quarter surrounding it. The grand facade of the gate was reconstructed in the 1960s.

In addition to being the only original Roman gate still standing, Bab Sharqi is also the only gate of the eight gates of the Ancient City of Damascus to preserve its original form as a triple passageway, with the large central passageway for caravans and wheel traffic and the two smaller ones flanking the large one for pedestrians.

History
The gate, which was dedicated to the sun by the Romans and known to them as the Gate of The Sun, dates back to ca. 200 AD. Although the gate had little defensive structures in the Roman period, it was most likely flanked by towers from both sides. Its architecture was minimal with the only adoration being the tall pilasters projecting from its walls. Remains of the cross-city colonnade survive inside the gate. The Street Called Straight, still connects the eastern gate of the city to the western gate, or Bab al-Jabiyah.

Damascus was conquered by Muslims during the Rashidun era. Following the capture of Damascus by Khalid ibn al-Walid's army, he entered through this gate on 18 September 634. His granting of Christian citizens continued access to their churches in the eastern district started the gradual evolution of the city's Christian Quarter near the gate.

In the 12th-century during the reign of Nur ad-Din Zangi, the gate was partially blocked except for the central opening which was converted into a bent entrance. A minaret was also added on top of the gate.

References

External links

 Old Damascus Gates

Gates of Damascus
Neighborhoods of Damascus
Buildings and structures completed in the 3rd century
Christian communities in Syria